Jean-Maurice Oulouma (born 12 March 1983) is an Ivorian rugby union player. He plays as a centre or as a wing.

Oulouma has been playing in France, where he moved aged 7 years old. He first played at RC Massy from his youth years, in 1990–91, being promoted to the first team in 2001–02, until 2005–06, moving then to US Bressane, in 2006–07, at the Fédérale 1, where he won the Jean Prat Trophy. Oulouma played two seasons at FC Grenoble (2007–08, 2008–09), at the Pro D2, and afterwards, two more seasons at Oyonnax Rugby (2009–10-2010–11], also at Pro D2. He plays at Football Club Sportif Rumilly since 2011–12, at Fédérale 1.

Oulouma plays for Ivory Coast since 2000.

References

External links
Jean-Maurice Oulouma Statistics

1983 births
Living people
Ivorian rugby union players
Rugby union centres
Rugby union wings
Ivorian expatriate rugby union players
Expatriate rugby union players in France
Ivorian expatriate sportspeople in France